Viburnum triphyllum is a plant of the family Adoxaceae, native to South America. Commonly known in Spanish as chuchua or chuque.

Description
It is a tree that can reach up to 15 meters high, has a crooked trunk that is a characteristic of the vegetation of the high Andean forests. Its leaves are lemon green and pale green on the underside and its texture is similar to that of cardboard paper. Its flowers are white, grouped in an umbrella-shaped inflorescence (umbel), which exhales a pleasant smell. The fruits are fleshy, their color is red wine when ripe.

Distribution
It is distributed in the Andean forest areas at a height of between 2400 and 3400 meters above sea level; in Bolivia, Colombia, Ecuador and Peru.

Ecology
This species is of great importance in ecological restoration due to its high rate of foliar exchange, its association with fungi (mycorrhizae) and nitrogen fixing bacteria. In addition, they usually support nutrient-poor, shallow and eroded soils.

Uses
Its wood is used in construction and as fuel for wood furnaces, the tree has tannins in its bark, used in tanneries; from its fruits a violet dye is obtained that can be used in handicraft work. Ornamental is planted in parks and road separators. Ecologically provides good food for birds and insects, especially bee). It is useful in watershed protection, and is an inductor of restoration processes. It is also used as a live fence and windbreaker.

Common names in Spanish
Bodoquero, chucua, chuque, garrocho, juco, morochillo, pelotillo, pita, ruque, sauco de monte.

References

Flora of South America
Flora of Colombia
triphyllum